Training Day may refer to:

 Inset day, teacher in-service training day, in United Kingdom schools
 Training Day, a 2001 American crime thriller film
 Training Day (soundtrack), soundtrack of the film above
 Training Day (TV series), CBS TV series based on the 2001 film 
 "Training Day" (Archer), second episode of the animated comedy Archer
 "Training Day" (The Office), 19th episode of the seventh season of the American comedy TV series The Office
 "Training Day" (Arrow), an episode of the CW series Arrow
 Training Day (album), 2007 album, the second by hip hop duo The Away Team